Woman in Blue is an oil on canvas portrait of an unknown woman, executed in the late 1770s - early 1780s, by the English artist Thomas Gainsborough, during his fifteen-year-stay in Bath, Somerset.

Some art historians have identified its subject as the Duchess of Beaufort, daughter of Edward Boscawen. It is now in the collection of the Hermitage Museum in Saint Petersburg, to which it was left in 1916 by Alexei Khitrovo, making it the only work by the artist in Russia.

References

Portraits by Thomas Gainsborough
1770s paintings
Paintings in the collection of the Hermitage Museum